Behavior Tech Computer (BTC) manufactures many computer accessories including keyboards, webcams and mouse devices; they used to manufacture optical drives but decided to leave the market and sold their Optical Division to Foxconn.

The company was founded in 1982, launching a capacitance keyboard the following year. International expansion followed rapidly:
 1986 BTC USA
 1988 BTC Korea 
 1989 BTC Europe - a sales hub based in the Netherlands
 1991 BTC France
 1992 BTC Latin - based in Florida, USA
 1993 BTC Germany - with a focus on Germany and Eastern Europe

The expansion has led to BTC being described by the Taiwanese Business Weekly magazine as the "third most internationalized" company in Taiwan.

See also
 List of companies of Taiwan

References

1982 establishments in Taiwan
Computer peripheral companies
Electronics companies of Taiwan
Companies listed on the Taiwan Stock Exchange
Taiwanese brands